John Bergin Moloney (15 November 1881 – 20 June 1948) was an Australian rules footballer who played with St Kilda in the Victorian Football League (VFL).

Notes

External links 

1881 births
1948 deaths
Australian rules footballers from Victoria (Australia)
St Kilda Football Club players
Port Melbourne Football Club players